"Find the Answer" is the 54th single by Japanese boy band Arashi. It was released on February 21, 2018 under their record label J Storm. "Find the Answer" was used as the theme song for television drama 99.9 Keiji Senmon Bengoshi — Season II starring member Jun Matsumoto.

Single information
"Find the Answer" was released in two editions: a limited edition and a regular edition. The first-run limited edition was a CD containing two songs and a karaoke track of the B-side song, and a DVD containing the music video and making of "Find the Answer". The regular edition contains four songs, each of which comes with an original karaoke track.

Songs
"Find the Answer" is used as the theme song for the television drama 99.9 Keiji Senmon Bengoshi — Season II, starring member Jun Matsumoto, which was first broadcast on January 14, 2018. The song debuted first at the ending credits of the first broadcast of the drama. Just like the previous song used for the first season of the drama, "Find the Answer" includes an "enveloping tenderness" that describes Matsumoto's character in the drama who, even when facing the most difficult cases, "will push forward in belief of a 0.1 percent possibility". The song was described as simple and with an upbeat tempo.

The fourth track of the regular edition, titled  was used as the theme song for the Nippon Television network's coverage of the 2018 Winter Olympics in Pyeongchang, which featured member Sho Sakurai as the main newscaster. Following "Power of the Paradise", this is the seventh time the group has provided the theme song for NTV's news coverage for Summer and Winter Olympic Games. The song is described as powerful, yet filled with tenderness to inspire courage for the athletes who continue to step up to challenges.

Track listing

Charts and certifications

Weekly charts

Sales and certifications

Release history

References

External links
Product information at the official website 

Arashi songs
2018 singles
2018 songs
Oricon Weekly number-one singles
Billboard Japan Hot 100 number-one singles